Sarawak Dayak Iban Association (SADIA) is a community organization representing the Iban community of Sarawak. Formerly known as the Dayak Federation, it was formed in 1919 and renamed to its current title in 1984.

Notes

Sarawak
1919 establishments in Sarawak